Praja is a 2001 Indian Malayalam-language political action thriller film directed by Joshiy and written by Renji Panicker. It was also produced by Joshiy and Panicker. The film stars Mohanlal, Cochin Haneefa, Biju Menon, Manoj K Jayan and Babu Namboothiri. Bollywood actor Anupam Kher appears in a guest role. The film's songs were composed by M. G. Radhakrishnan, while C. Rajamani provided the background score. This movie become great opening of the box office and but failure to continue.

Plot 

Ex-underworld don Zakkir Ali Hussein, after giving up violence, is settled peacefully in the suburbs of Kochi. It was under the strong influence of his foster father, Bappu Haji Mustafa, that he left Mumbai. An unsuccessful assassination attempt on Haji Mustafa in Mumbai by Raman Naik, an underworld don ignites old wounds in Hussein. He, despite repeated pleas from Haji Mustafa and Ilanthaloor Rama Varma, a father like figure, sets out to Mumbai along with his trusted lieutenant Hamid Plavilakandi Mather, alias Malayalees.

With the help of his friend Arjun, Hussein kills down Raman Naik and reaches back in Kochi. On his way back, at Kochi, he meets up with Maya Mary Kurien, Asst. Commissioner of Police, who slowly starts developing a crush on him. Later, Hussein is visited by Balaraman, a liquor baron and a former M.P and M.L.A, who warns Hussein of dire consequences if he continues to interfere in the Mumbai crime world. He also attempts to woo Hussein, but the latter refuses to bow down, sending strong warning to Balaraman and his group.

Balaraman, along with Devadevan Nambiar, alias DD, and Arun Naik, the brother of Raman Naik in Mumbai, is planning to finish off Hussein and Haji Mustafa to regain the lost turf in Mumbai. They are supported by the tainted, savage and two-faced Lahayil Vakkachan, Home Minister of Kerala. Joseph Madachery, the D.I.G of police conducts a raid at Haji Mustafa's poor home on behalf of Vakachan, and beats up Rama Varma Thirumulpad brutally, but the sudden arrival of Hussein saves him. Joseph is severely beaten by Zakir in full public presence, which infuriates Balaraman and DD, who try to demoralize Hussein by publishing fabricated stories about his relationship with ACP Maya Kurein and inmates of Haji Mustafa Trust's destitute home.

Then enters SP David Abraham IPS, who is an honest cop and also the close aide and sidekick of Hussein. He goes to meet Lahayil Vakachan who tries to create a truce between Hussein and Balaraman, but fails miserably and gets violently berated and stripped in the presence of a lady M.L.A by Hussein. This leads to a series of problems, including the arrest of Jaganathan (Appu), a close buddy of Hussein, on false narcotic drug charges from Haji Mustafa Trust. Left with no other option, Hussein decides to meet the Chief Minister for Appu's release from unlawful apprehension. Then, Joseph arrests Hussein for providing refuge to Appu and hoarding drugs in the trust's medicine store (a forged charge) - later, Hussein is released.

A well coordinated murder attempt is made on Hussein by professional assassins hired from Bombay, he escapes valiantly - defeating the hitmen. Jaganathan is killed in police custody. Balaraman and DD kills Rama Varma Thirumulpad, which prompts Hussein to take the law in his own hands. At a public gathering - a three day convention organised to commemorate the 50th Anniversary of Vakkachan's political entry - while addressing thousands of party workers, Hussein enters by duping police and exposes the real intentions Lahayil Vakkachan, Balaraman, Devadevan and Joseph to the public. Despite the warnings from police chief commandos and beggings from the victims themselves, Hussein, Malayalees, David and Arjun tie them up and place a bomb in a flower bag. Hussein throws the remote on the ground and due to severe running stampedes, the bomb explodes killing Lahayil Vakkachan, Balaraman, DD and Joseph. Hussein, Malayalees, David and Arjun are proud for finishing their mission.

Cast

Release 
The film was released on 14 December 2001.

Box office
The film received mixed reviews from the critics, and it was an average hit at the box office.

Soundtrack 

The features songs composed by M. G. Radhakrishnan, and written by Gireesh Puthenchery, M. D. Rajendran, and M. P. Muralidharan. The soundtrack also includes the song "Yeh Zindagi Usi Ki Hai" from the 1953 film Anarkali. The soundtrack album was released by Satyam Audios on 19 July 2001.

References

External links 
 

Films directed by Joshiy
2000s Malayalam-language films
2000s crime films
2001 films
Indian political thriller films
Films shot in Kochi
Films shot in Mumbai
Indian gangster films
Films scored by M. G. Radhakrishnan
2001 action films